Stomopteryx basalis is a moth of the family Gelechiidae. It was described by Staudinger in 1876. It is found in Portugal, France, Italy, and on Corsica, Sicily, Malta, Crete and Cyprus.

The wingspan is about 15 mm. The forewings are grey irrorated dark grey with a trapezoidal basal blotch occupying the dorsal half to one-fourth, with its upper posterior angle acutely prominent on the fold to the middle, and a subcostal streak to near one-third confluent, with this at the base bronzy-ochreous. There is a small obscure spot of darker grey suffusion representing the second discal stigma and a suffused white spot on the costa at three-fourths. The hindwings are grey.

References

Moths described in 1876
Stomopteryx